Henri Paris (9 August 1935 – 24 May 2021) was a French general.

Publications 
 Stratégie militaire soviétique et américaine  (Prix Vauban 1981), FEDN Sept Couleurs.
 Les fondements doctrinaux de la stratégie soviétique, en collaboration avec les membres du Groupe d'études et de recherche sur la stratégie soviétique - FEDN, Sept Couleurs.
 Le Niveau de vie en Tchécoslovaquie.
  Le pacte de Varsovie en action. Thèse de Doctorat, mention très honorable avec félicitations du jury.
 Stratégie soviétique et chute du pacte de Varsovie - Publications de la Sorbonne - 1995.
 L'atome rouge -  l'Harmattan - 1996.
 L'arbalète, la pierre à fusil et l'atome  - Albin Michel - 1997.
 Vers une armée citoyenne - Direction d'un ouvrage collectif - L'Harmattan - 1998.
 Cent complots pour les Cent-jours - L'Harmattan  - 2001
 USA : échec et mat - Édition Jacques-Marie Laffont – 2004
 Le pétrole tue l’Afrique – Édition Des Riaux - 2007
 Ces guerres qui viennent - Edition Me Fantascope - 2011
 L'Oncle Sam et le Mandarin - Edition NUVIS - 2013

References

1935 births
2021 deaths
French generals
Socialist Party (France) politicians
École Spéciale Militaire de Saint-Cyr alumni
People from Neuilly-sur-Seine
Commandeurs of the Légion d'honneur